Hastey Hastey is a 2008 Hindi romantic comedy film starring Jimmy Sheirgill, Rajpal Yadav, newcomers Nisha Rawal and Monishka. It is directed by Tonny and produced by Go Cam Films in association with Inox.

Music 
The title song of the film is sung by the producer, Kumar Shivram who is successful as a "double diamond" in the MLM Business with Amway Global. "Almaad Sere Khuda" is another popular track of the film sung by Zubeen Garg.

"Bheegi Bheegi Teri Julfein" - Kunal Ganjawala
"Almadad Chere Khuda" - Zubeen Garg
"Hastey Hastey" (happy) - Sunidhi Chauhan, Shiv Ram Kumar
"Hastey Hastey" (sad) - Shiv Ram Kumar, Sunidhi Chauhan
"Hum Hai Tum Ho" - Sunidhi Chauhan
"New Age Mantra" - Sunidhi Chauhan, Kunal Ganjawala
"New Age Mantra" (2) - Sunidhi Chauhan
"New Age Mantra" (Male) - Kunal Ganjawala
"Rock The World" - Sunidhi Chauhan, Shaan
"Rock The World" (Female) - Sunidhi Chauhan
"Rock The World" (Male) - Shaan

References

External links
 
 IndiaFm review
 Official Website

2000s Hindi-language films
2008 films
Films scored by Anu Malik